Wyoming Highway 374 (WYO 374) is a  discontinuous east-west Wyoming State Road located in Sweetwater County that exists in two sections, with a short gap in between.

Route description
Wyoming Highway 374 begins its western end at exit 61 of Interstate 80, southwest of Granger. WYO 374 travels along the north side of I-80, acting as a frontage road, for just under 5 miles until it reaches U.S. Route 30 where it temporarily ends. Further east along I-80/US 30, Highway 374 resumes at exit 68 at Little America. WYO 374 once again travels along the north side of I-80. At approximately 3.5 miles, Tenneco Road (CR 85) is intersected which provides access to exit 72 of I-80/US 30. Further east, Highway 374 reaches the southern terminus of Wyoming Highway 372 (La Barge Road) at a T intersection. WYO 372 travels north from here to Wyoming Highway 28 and U.S. Route 189 while WYO 374 turns south and immediately intersects exit 83 of I-80/US 30. Now Highway 374 travels eastward toward Green River on the south side of the interstate. As WYO 374 enters James Town, a census-designated place (CDP) west of Green River, Covered Wagon Road (CR 59) is intersected which provides access to exit 85 of I-80/US 30 and travels north to the Rolling Green Country Club. Shortly after, Highway 374 crosses the Green River and at 20.43 miles (25.37 total) the highway reaches its eastern terminus at the Green River business routes of I-80 and US 30 (Flaming Gorge Way) in Green River. Traveling north of here is exit 89 of I-80/US 30, while traveling south heads into downtown Green River and to Wyoming Highway 530.   

Wyoming Highway 374 is not signed at any of its interchanges with Interstate 80.

History
Wyoming Highway 374 is the original alignment of U.S. Route 30 from near Granger to Green River.

Major intersections

References

External links 

 Wyoming State Routes 300-399
 WYO 374 - I-80 Bus/US 30 Bus to I-80/US 30
 WYO 374 - I-80/US 30 to WYO 372
 WYO 374 - WYO 372 to I-80/US 30
 WYO 374 - US 30 to I-80

Transportation in Sweetwater County, Wyoming
374